Alexander James Oprey (born 27 November 1983), is a professional footballer who is currently a Free Agent. He was born in London, England and is of Brazilian descent.

Career
Alex began his career in the youth system of Brazilian powerhouse Atlético Paranaense and earned his first team debut at age 18. His performances in South America's top club competition the Copa Libertadores attracted the interest of many clubs and led to a trial spell in July 2004 in England with Chelsea. He was offered more time to adapt but opted against the move to seal a dream deal with Santos. After a successful season he pursued his dream of playing in Europe and he was offered a one-week trial pending a medical with La Liga outfit Real Betis. He subsequently failed the medical due to a back injury and missed the 2007 season. He has since enjoyed spells in Ecuador with Deportivo Quito and Aucas before signing for Italian Serie B side Salernitana in July 2009. His time in Italy was cut short due to the club's financial troubles and eventual bankruptcy. He has had offers from Cyprus and has attracted interest from a host of South American club's but is keen to remain in Europe. 
Alex is best known for his pace, strength and his dribbling ability led to be nicknamed "The English Lord" by the Ecuadorian media.

References

1983 births
Living people
English footballers
Nest-Sotra Fotball players
English expatriate sportspeople in Norway
Expatriate footballers in Norway
Association football wingers